Infor XA is commercial ERP software used to control the operations of manufacturing companies.  Its prior name, MAPICS, is an acronym for Manufacturing, Accounting and Production Information Control Systems. MAPICS was created by IBM, International Business Machines, but the product is now owned by Infor Global Solutions.

Originally all MAPICS code ran only on IBM midrange systems like the IBM System 34, 36, 38 and the IBM AS/400, via succeeding versions of the platform - currently IBM i on IBM Power Systems. Early versions were written in IBM RPG, augmented with Control Language programs.  IBM's version of SQL is also utilized on the OS integrated database system called Db2 for i .  Recent development efforts have added object oriented components written in the Java programming language, which extends a portion of the XA product to servers running Java.  

However, the Infor XA product still requires the IBM i operating system.  The Java components provide an application runtime which allow user customizations, a rich user interface, an optional web-based interface as well as support for XML interfaces.

Timeline

See also
List of ERP software packages
List of ERP vendors

References

Industrial automation
ERP software
IBM software